Kirk Ciarrocca (born August 12, 1965), is the offensive coordinator for the Rutgers Scarlet Knights. He most recently served as the offensive coordinator at the University of Minnesota. Prior to that he spent a year as the offensive coordinator for Penn State University.

Early life
Ciarrocca, a native of York County, graduated from Red Land High School in Lewisberry, Pennsylvania. After high school he attended Juniata College, where he played defensive back for the Eagles football team before a knee injury ended his career.  He continued his education at Temple University, where he earned both a bachelor's and master's degree in education.

Coaching career
Ciarrocca began his coaching career in 1990 as an offensive graduate assistant at his alma mater Temple.  He spent the 1992 and 1993 seasons as the passing game coordinator and wide receivers coach at Western Connecticut State and Delaware Valley respectively. He returned to Western Connecticut State as the offensive coordinator for the 1994 and 1995 seasons before spending six seasons in the Ivy League.

From 1996 to 1999 Ciarrocca served as the wide receiver coach and junior varsity head coach for the Princeton Tigers.  The next two seasons Ciarrocca served as the wide receivers coach at the University of Pennsylvania.

Delaware
Ciarrocca spent six seasons as the offensive coordinator and quarterbacks coach for the Delaware Fightin' Blue Hens and head coach K. C. Keeler from 2002 to 2007.  During his time at Delaware, the Blue Hens posted a record of 52-26, winning the 2003 Division I-AA National Championship. Ciarrocca mentored Joe Flacco who was a first round selection in the 2008 NFL Draft.  Flacco led the Blue Hens to an 11-4 record and the FCS title game.

Rutgers
In 2008, Ciarrocca was hired by the Rutgers University and head coach Greg Schiano as the Scarlet Knights wide receivers coach.  During his time as wide receivers coach, Ciarrocca tutored Kenny Britt who was selected in the first round of the 2009 NFL Draft and Tiquan Underwood who was selected in the seventh round of that same draft.  Following the 2008 season, Ciarrocca was promoted to quarterbacks coach and co-offensive coordinator for the Scarlet Knights, a title he would share with offensive line coach Kyle Flood.  This is a title that Ciarrocca would hold for two season before being fired.  In 2010, the Scarlet Knighs' offense ranked 114th out of 120 teams, and finished with a 4-8 record.

Richmond and Delaware
Ciarrocca spent the 2011 season coaching quarterbacks for the Richmond Spiders and interim head coach Wayne Lineburg before rejoined the Delaware staff and head coach K.C. Keeler as the teams running backs coach in 2012.

Western Michigan
In 2013, Ciarrocca joined the staff of the Western Michigan Broncos and head coach P. J. Fleck as the team's offensive coordinator and quarterbacks coach.  Fleck and Ciarrocca were on the same staff at Rutgers during the 2010 season.  In 2015, Ciarrocca's offense featured a duo of receivers in Daniel Braverman and Corey Davis who each finished the season with more than 1,300 receiving yards.

Minnesota
In 2017, it was announced that Ciarrocca would be following head coach P.J. Fleck to Minnesota to be the team's offensive coordinator and quarterbacks coach.

Penn State
On December 26, 2019, it was announced that Ciarrocca was hired by the Penn State Nittany Lions and head coach James Franklin as the offensive coordinator and quarterback coach, a position left vacant by Ricky Rahne. After one season, Ciarrocca was fired and replaced by Mike Yurcich.

Minnesota
On December 6, 2021, it was announced that Ciarrocca would return to Minnesota to be the team's offensive coordinator and quarterbacks coach.

Rutgers
On January 7, 2023, Ciarrocca officially returned to Rutgers to be the team's offensive coordinator and quarterbacks coach.

References

External links
 Delaware profile
 Rutgers profile
 Western Michigan profile
 Minnesota profile
 Penn State profile

1965 births
Living people
Delaware Fightin' Blue Hens football coaches
Delaware Valley Aggies football coaches
Juniata Eagles football players
Minnesota Golden Gophers football coaches
Penn State Nittany Lions football coaches
Penn Quakers football coaches
Princeton Tigers football coaches
Richmond Spiders football coaches
Rutgers Scarlet Knights football coaches
Western Connecticut State Colonials football coaches
Western Michigan Broncos football coaches
Temple University alumni